Strange Gateways is a collection of stories by American writer E. Hoffmann Price. It was released in 1967 by Arkham House in an edition of 2,007 copies.  It was the author's first hardcover collection. The tale "Tarbis of the Lake" is a collaboration with H. P. Lovecraft.

Contents
Strange Gateways contains the following tales:

 "The Fire and the Flesh"
 "Graven Image"
 "The Stranger from Kurdistan"
 "The Rajah's Gift"
 "The Girl From Samarkand"
 "Tarbis of the Lake"
 "Bones for China"
 "Well of the Angels"
 "Strange Gateway"
 "Apprentice Magician"
 "One More River"
 "Pale Hands"

Sources

References 

1967 short story collections
Fantasy short story collections
Horror short story collections
Arkham House books